The Woman in the Fifth (French title La femme du Vème) is a 2011 French-British-Polish drama film directed and written by Paweł Pawlikowski. Adapted from Douglas Kennedy's 2007 novel of the same name, the film centers on a divorced American writer (Ethan Hawke) who moves to Paris to be closer to his young daughter. As he embarks on an affair with a mysterious widow (Kristin Scott Thomas), a dark force seems to be taking control of his life.

Plot
American writer Tom Ricks arrives in Paris to be closer to his young daughter who lives with his ex-wife. We learn that the divorce was caused by Tom's mental illness, from which he has apparently recovered. Completely broke, he accepts a job as a night guard for a local crime boss who owns a run down hostel. Stationed in a basement office, his only task is to push a button when a bell rings. The tranquility of the night, he hopes, will help him focus on his new novel. His days become more exciting when he starts a romance with Margit, a mysterious and elegant widow who sets strange rules to their meetings: she will only see him at her apartment in the fifth arrondissement, at 5pm sharp, twice a week and he should ask no questions about her work or her past life. He also gets closer to Ania, the Polish barmaid of the hostel where he lives, who has literary interests.

Tom's relationship with Ania eventually becomes a sexual affair, and his neighbor blackmails him about it. Shortly after the neighbor is killed, his daughter goes missing, and Tom begins to believe that a dark force has entered his life, punishing anyone who has recently done him wrong. After the police accuse him of murdering his neighbor, Tom tries to use his weekly visits to Margit's apartment as an alibi. The police check and find out that she died and hasn't lived at this address for the past 15 years. He is let go, after the police determines that the murderer was in fact the owner of the hostel. When the two meet in the corridor of the police station, one is led to believe that somebody planted evidence to frame the owner of the hostel.

He continues the affair with Ania, but also decides to encounter Margit again, and tells her she is not real. She says she is the most real love he'll encounter in his life, and that she knows him from the inside. She tells him to lose his muse and say goodbye to his wife and daughter. They embrace and he accuses her of having done something with his daughter, and he starts to choke her. His daughter is eventually found wandering in the forest, and is reunited with her mother.

In the final scene, Ania waits for him at the bar but Tom ascends the stairs once again to Margit's apartment. The movie fades out as the door to her apartment opens.

Cast
 Ethan Hawke as Tom Ricks
 Kristin Scott Thomas as Margit Kadar
 Joanna Kulig as Ania
 Samir Guesmi as Sezer
 Marcela Iacub as Isabella
 Anne Benoît as Teacher
 Grégory Gadebois as Lieutenant Children Unit

Production
The Woman in the Fifth was produced by Paris-based Haut Et Court with UK's Film4 Productions, and co-financed by the UK Film Council and SPI Poland.

Pawlikowski saw the film as "a story about a man torn between the need for family and stability and the need to be creative". In 2009, he approached Hawke to play the lead character while the actor was performing in a play at the Old Vic in London. Thomas was cast as the "woman in the Fifth" shortly afterward.

The filming took place in Paris from April to June 2010.

Release
Premiered at the 2011 Toronto International Film Festival, the film opened in France on 16 November 2011. The following year it was released in the UK on 17 February and in the US on 15 June.

Reception
The film received mixed reviews, with a "fresh" rating of 63% on Rotten Tomatoes and a score of 57 at Metacritic.

References

External links
 
 
 

2011 films
Polish mystery films
2010s English-language films
2010s French-language films
Films based on American novels
Films directed by Paweł Pawlikowski
Films set in Paris
French mystery films
British independent films
Film4 Productions films
English-language French films
English-language Polish films
British mystery films
2010s British films
2010s French films